"Tell Me What It's Worth" is the third single from Lightspeed Champion's debut album Falling Off the Lavender Bridge, released on CD and 7" vinyl by Domino Records on 14 January 2008.

The lyrics of the song concern the verbal abuse lead singer Devonte Hynes' receives from other black people; "The only racial hatred I ever get walking down the street in Dalston is from rude boys. It's really weird."

It entered the UK Singles Chart at #72

Track listing

References

External links
Lightspeed Champion Official Site
"Tell Me What It's Worth" video
"Tell Me What It's Worth" Review

2008 singles
Songs written by Dev Hynes
2008 songs
Domino Recording Company singles